Isidoro Verga (29 April 1832 – 10 August 1899) was an Italian canon lawyer and cardinal.

He was created cardinal in 1884, and became bishop of Albano and Apostolic Penitentiary in 1896, and given the titular church of San Callisto.

Notes

External links
Catholic Hierarchy page 
Biography

1832 births
1899 deaths
19th-century Italian cardinals
Cardinals created by Pope Leo XIII
Cardinal-bishops of Albano
Canon law jurists
Major Penitentiaries of the Apostolic Penitentiary
19th-century jurists